Mark Christopher Roopenian (born July 10, 1958) is a former American football nose tackle who played two seasons with the Buffalo Bills of the National Football League. He played college football at Boston College and attended Watertown High School in Watertown, Massachusetts.

References

External links
Just Sports Stats

Living people
1958 births
Players of American football from Massachusetts
American football defensive tackles
Boston College Eagles football players
Buffalo Bills players
Sportspeople from Medford, Massachusetts
Watertown High School (Massachusetts) alumni